The Republic of Ghana has several diplomatic missions worldwide. As a member of the Commonwealth of Nations, Ghanaian diplomatic missions in the capitals of other Commonwealth members are known as High Commissions.

Excluded from this listing are honorary consulates and trade missions.

Current missions

Africa

Americas

Asia

Europe

Oceania

Multilateral organizations

Gallery

Closed missions

Americas

Asia

Europe

See also
Foreign relations of Ghana
List of Ambassadors and High Commissioners of Ghana
List of diplomatic missions in Ghana
Visa policy of Ghana

Notes

References

Sources
 Ghanaian Ministry of Foreign Affairs

 
Diplomatic missions
Ghana